Procurator General may refer to:

 Procurator General (Russia), an office of Imperial Russia
 Prosecutor General of Armenia, the senior law officer of Armenia
 Procurator General of Macau, the senior law officer of Macau
 Procurator General of the Soviet Union, the highest functionary of the Office of Public Prosecutor of the USSR
 Prosecutor-General of Russia, the head of the system of official prosecution in courts in Russia
 Prosecutor General of Ukraine, the head of the system of official prosecution in courts in Ukraine
 HM Procurator General, one of the positions held by the Treasury Solicitor in the United Kingdom

See also 
 Procurator (disambiguation)
 Public procurator
 Public prosecutor general (disambiguation)